was a US record label of Sony Music Entertainment Japan that was launched in 2003 to distribute Japanese Sony artists in the United States, and that closed in 2007. Their first signed artist was T.M.Revolution, and they used the anime fandom community to spread the word. T.M.Revolution's U.S. concert debut at Otakon 2003 was successful, drawing an audience of over 5,000.

Tofu Records' second signing was with L'Arc-en-Ciel. The label kicked off publicity for the group with a concert at 1st Mariner Arena in Baltimore, Maryland during Otakon 2004. L'Arc-en-Ciel made 1st Mariner Arena history by being the first music group from Japan to headline there. The concert drew an estimated 12,000. In 2006, Tofu Records also published the Splurge album by pop rock duo PUFFY. They also represented Nami Tamaki, High and Mighty Color, ZONE, Miss Monday, Rhymester, Soulhead and Polysics.

In March 2007, Tofu Records closed. Releases on Sony Music Japan now appear on Columbia or Epic Records through a new deal.

Releases 
All releases listed at discogs.com.

See also 
 List of record labels

References

External links 
 Official site at archive.org

Sony Music Entertainment Japan
Former Sony subsidiaries
Record labels established in 2003
Record labels disestablished in 2007
Defunct record labels of the United States
Rock record labels
Pop record labels
Companies based in Santa Monica, California